Subhadra Devi is a Mithilia artist from Bihar and known for Madhubani Painting and patron of Mithila Kala Vikas Samiti. She is awarded India's fourth highest civilian award the Padma Shri in 2023.

Personal life 
She was born in 1941 in Madhubani, Bihar. Her exact date of birth is unknown. a resident of Salempur village in Madhubani district, learnt artwork of papier-mâché in her childhood by watching others.

She remained active in artwork from 1970 to till now. Her art work "Kṛṣṇa and Radha in a banana grove" is displayed in the British museum.

References 

1941 births
Living people
Indian painters
Recipients of the Padma Shri in arts
Painters from Bihar